The 2005 G.I. Joe's Presents the Champ Car Grand Prix of Portland was the fourth round of the 2005 Bridgestone Presents the Champ Car World Series Powered by Ford season, held on June 19, 2005 at the Portland International Raceway in Portland, Oregon.  The pole sitter was Justin Wilson and the race was won by Cristiano da Matta.  It marked the 12th and final Champ Car victory for the 2002 CART champion.  It was also the first career Champ Car pole for Wilson, the first of eight in his American open wheel career.

Qualifying results

* Nelson Philippe crashed in practice before the first qualifying session and was not able to set a time.

Race

Caution flags

Notes 

 New Track Record Justin Wilson 57.597 (Qualification Session #1)
 New Race Lap Record Sébastien Bourdais 59.923
 New Race Record Cristiano da Matta 1:51:51.404
 Average Speed 110.616 mph

Championship standings after the race

Drivers' Championship standings

 Note: Only the top five positions are included.

External links
 Full Weekend Times & Results
 Friday Qualifying Results
 Saturday Qualifying Results
 Race Box Score

Portland
Grand Prix of Portland